Gulledge Township, population 2,238, is one of eight townships in Anson County, North Carolina. This township does not have any cities or towns within it.

Geography
Gulledge Township is drained by North Fork of Jones Creek and its tributary, Lampley Branch in the northeast.  The central part of the township is drained by South Fork Jones Creek.  The southern part of the township is drained by Thompson Creek and its tributaries, Rhoddy Creek and Deadfall Creek.

References

Townships in Anson County, North Carolina
Townships in North Carolina